P76 or P-76 may refer to:

 Bell P-76, an American fighter aircraft
 Leyland P76, an Australian automobile
 Papyrus 76, a biblical manuscript
 WM P76, a French prototype sports racing car
 P76, a state regional road in Latvia